The Collartidini is a tribe of thread-legged bugs restricted to Africa, Sri Lanka and Taiwan. Wygodzinsky (1966) proposed that this group is the sister group of the remaining Emesinae.

List of genera
Collartida Villiers, 1949
Mangabea Villiers, 1970
Stenorhamphus Elkins, 1962

References

Reduviidae
Hemiptera tribes